Pale Communion is the eleventh studio album by Swedish progressive rock band Opeth. The album was released on 26 August 2014 through Roadrunner Records. The album was produced by Mikael Åkerfeldt and mixed by Steven Wilson. Pale Communion is the first album with keyboardist Joakim Svalberg after the departure of Per Wiberg in 2011. The album sold 19,090 copies in its first week of release in the United States, debuting at number 19 on the Billboard 200.

Musical style
Mikael Åkerfeldt said of the album, "I wanted to do something more melodic with this album, so there's stronger vocal melodies and more melodies overall for this album." Greg Kennelty of Metal Injection said the album does not contain "growls or death metal vocals". He also described the album as "the missing link between Damnation and Ghost Reveries or if Heritage was written directly after Ghost Reveries without Watershed having ever existed".

AllMusic's Thom Jurek has compared the album to Deep Purple's In Rock and King Crimson's early music, as well as noting the influence from jazz fusion.

Artwork
The cover art was designed by Travis Smith, who has designed several previous Opeth album covers. The artwork contains Latin text. The left panel quotes Axel Oxenstierna: "Don't you know, my son, with how little wisdom the world is governed?" (An nesci, mi fili, quantilla prudentia mundus regatur?). The middle panel quotes Terence: "In these days friends are won through flattery, the truth gives birth to hate." (Hoc tempore obsequium amicos, veritas odium parit, Andria, vv. 67-68). The right panel quotes Marcus Valerius Martialis: "He grieves truly who grieves without a witness." (Ille dolet vere qui sine teste dolet, Epigrammata, I, 33).

Reception

Pale Communion was met with positive reviews from music critics. At Metacritic (a review aggregator site which assigns a normalized rating out of 100 from music critics), based on 12 critics, the album has received a score of 75/100, which indicates "generally favorable" reviews.

Writing for The Guardian, Dom Lawson gave the album a perfect rating, giving particular praise to Mikael Åkerfeldt's singing, writing that "his ability to tug at heartstrings while singing the most wilfully hazy of lyrics is matched only by these songs' beautiful arrangements and pin-sharp ensemble playing." He singled out the closing track for particular praise, describing it as "at once the most profoundly moving song Åkerfeldt has ever written, and a tantalising glimpse into one possible future for this peerless band."

Thom Jurek also praised the album in the review for AllMusic. In the article, he compared it to Opeth's previous albums, claiming "Truthfully, they had been exploring prog in fits and starts since 2005's Ghost Reveries. Pale Communion completes the transition, proving that Heritage was not only a next step, but a new beginning altogether... Pale Communion is more focused and refined than Heritage. Though they readily display numerous musical influences here, ultimately Opeth sound like no one but themselves. This set is a massive leap forward, not only in terms of style but also in its instrumental and performance acumen; it is nearly unlimited in its creativity."

Sarah Kitteringham was more reserved in her appraisal of the album for Exclaim!, stating "The tracks run long (nothing below four-and-a-half minutes), and the highlights come for those with patience (the album peaks, like Heritage did, in the latter half); Pale Communion is a grower. One particular element that runs through the entirety of Opeth's discography is copiously present: those ominous riffs and a sense of moody, brooding emotionality. It certainly won't be enough to appease Opeth fans infuriated by Heritage (or, if you go further back, by the polarizing Watershed), but it will intrigue and appease those willing to accept the band's expanded sound."

Pitchfork's Grayson Currin was considerably more critical about the album: "Pale Communion, Opeth's first album in three years, lacks the absolute willpower and prevailing ambition of the band’s best work—that is, the core that made the awkwardness sufferable." Grayson concluded his review by writing, "Even if you couldn’t abide the inflexibility of their methodical grandeur, it was hard to condemn the immense effort and imagination involved. But Pale Communion only toys with the building blocks, revealing influences that were already apparent but refusing to invigorate them alongside each other. It's not that Opeth isn't cool here. It's that these eight songs run cold on new energies and ideas, a rarity for a catalog custom-made to overwhelm."

Track listing

Personnel

Opeth
Mikael Åkerfeldt – lead vocals, lead guitar; songwriting, art direction, engineering
Fredrik Åkesson – lead guitar, backing vocals
Martín Méndez – bass guitar
Joakim Svalberg – keyboard, backing vocals; piano
Martin Axenrot – drums, percussion

Additional personnel
Dave Stewart – string arrangements
Tom Dalgety – engineering, production
Janne Hansson – engineering
Steven Wilson – mixing, backing vocals
Paschal Byrne – mastering
Travis Smith – cover art
Colin Bradburne – recording (bonus tracks)
João Paulo Costa Dias – recording (bonus tracks)

Chart positions

References

2014 albums
Opeth albums
Roadrunner Records albums
Albums with cover art by Travis Smith (artist)
Albums produced by Tom Dalgety
Albums recorded at Rockfield Studios